(born 26 February 1966) is a Japanese former ski jumper.

In the World Cup he finished twelve times among the top 10, his best result being a second place from Örnsköldsvik in March 1994.

He participated in the 1992 Winter Olympics in Albertville, where he finished 39th in the normal hill, 17th in the large hill and 4th in the team event.

External links

1966 births
Living people
Japanese male ski jumpers
Ski jumpers at the 1992 Winter Olympics
Olympic ski jumpers of Japan